Hubert Haskell Peavey (January 12, 1881 – November 21, 1937) was a U.S. Representative from Wisconsin.

Background 
Born in Adams, Minnesota, Peavey moved with his parents to Redwood Falls, Minnesota, in 1886. He attended the public schools, the high school at Redwood Falls, and Pillsbury Academy, in Owatonna, Minnesota. He pursued various activities in Nebraska, Kansas, and Oklahoma from 1900 until 1904, when he moved to South Dakota and engaged in the real estate business. He moved to Washburn, Wisconsin, in 1909 and continued the real estate business.

Public office 
He served as alderman in 1911 and as mayor of Washburn in 1912 and from 1920 to 1922. He was elected the member of the Wisconsin State Assembly from the newly created Bayfield County Assembly district in 1912 as a self-described "Progressive Republican" with 1,199 votes to 517 for Democrat Henry Wachsmith and 302 for Social Democrat Gustav Hering; he was not opposed by a regular Republican, and Republican incumbent William Knight was not a candidate. He was the only Assembly member to declare himself a "Progressive Republican" in the Wisconsin Blue Book for 1913. He was not a candidate for re-election in 1914, and was succeeded by Republican Walter A. Duffy.

He became editor and publisher of the Washburn News in 1915.

During the First World War, he joined Company D, Sixth Infantry, Wisconsin National Guard, and served as captain. He was an unsuccessful candidate for the Republican nomination in 1920 to the Sixty-seventh Congress.

Peavey was elected as a Republican to the Sixty-eighth and to the five succeeding Congresses. (March 4, 1923 – January 3, 1935) For his first five terms in office he represented Wisconsin's 11th congressional district; however, the district was eliminated in 1933 following the 1930 Census and so Peavey redistricted and was elected to represent Wisconsin's 10th district as part of the 73rd Congress.
He was an unsuccessful candidate for reelection in 1934 to the Seventy-fourth Congress.
He again engaged in the real estate business and also operated a fur ranch.
He died in Washburn, Wisconsin, on November 21, 1937.
He was interred in Woodland Cemetery.

References

External links

1881 births
1937 deaths
People from Mower County, Minnesota
Wisconsin city council members
Mayors of places in Wisconsin
Businesspeople from Wisconsin
Editors of Wisconsin newspapers
People from Washburn, Wisconsin
Republican Party members of the Wisconsin State Assembly
National Guard (United States) officers
American military personnel of World War I
Military personnel from Wisconsin
Wisconsin Progressives (1912)
Republican Party members of the United States House of Representatives from Wisconsin
Wisconsin National Guard personnel